The nineteenth European Masters Athletics Championships were held in Izmir, Turkey, from August 22–31, 2014. The European Masters Athletics Championships serve the division of the sport of athletics for people over 35 years of age, referred to as masters athletics.

Results

100 metres

200 metres

Shot put

Discus throw

Javelin throw

Throws pentathlon

5000 metre track race walk

References 
 

2014 European Masters Athletics Championships